Vispavarma  (Kharosthi: 𐨬𐨁𐨭𐨿𐨤𐨬𐨪𐨿𐨨) or Visnuvarma (Kharosthi: 𐨬𐨁𐨮𐨸𐨂𐨬𐨪𐨿𐨨 , ; ruled circa 0-20 CE) was an Indo-Scythian king of the Apracas, who ruled in the area of Bajaur in modern northwestern Pakistan. His reign is known for sure to include the date of 6 CE, due to his description as king on the 5-6 CE Bajaur casket.

Vispavarma is mainly known from a dedicatory Buddhist inscription by his son Indravarma, who mentions him as his father. The inscription which is written in Kharoshthi, translates into English as:

In the Bajaur casket inscription, Vispavarma is further described as king of the Apracas by his son Indravarma, the date of the dedication being 5-6 CE:

Since the Bajaur casket indicates that Vispavarma was king as of 5-6 CE, his reign is usually dated to around 0-20 CE.

See also
 Reliquary
 Apraca
 Bajaur

Notes

Indo-Scythian kings
1st-century monarchs in Asia
History of Pakistan